Admiral Golovko was the third ship of the Soviet Navy Project 58 Groznyy-class Guided Missile Cruisers (RKR), also known as the Kynda Class.

Design
Power was provided by two  TV-12 steam turbines, fuelled by four KVN-95/64 boilers and driving two fixed pitch screws.

The ship was designed for anti-ship warfare around two quadruple SM-70 P-35 launchers for 4K44 missiles (NATO reporting name SS-N-3 'Shaddock’), the vessel carrying a full set of reloads making a total of sixteen missiles. To defend against aircraft, the ship was equipped with a single twin ZIF-102 M-1 Volna launcher with sixteen V-600 4K90 (SA-N-1 ‘Goa’) missiles forward and two twin  guns aft, backed up by two single  guns. Four AK-630 close-in weapon systems were added in the early 1980s. Defence against submarines was provided by two triple  torpedoes and a pair of RBU-6000  anti-submarine rocket launchers.

Service
Launched 18 July 1962 with the name Doblestnyy ( –valiant), the vessel was renamed Admiral Golovko on 18 December 1962.

Admiral Golovko was accepted to the Northern Fleet on 22 January 1965 and was initially attached to the 120th Missile Ship Brigade. The vessel formed part of a task force that supported the United Arab Republic in June 1967, particularly providing air defence of shipping in the port of Alexandria during the Six-Day War.  Admiral Golovko was transferred to the 150th Missile Ship Brigade in the Black Sea Fleet from 22 March 1968 and visited Algiers, Algeria between 8 and 13 May 1970 before being transferred to the 70th Anti-Submarine Warfare Brigade in December 1970. Operations in the Black Sea included a visit to Constanța, Romania in August 1973. In April 1975, the vessel rejoined the 150th Missile Ship Brigade and returned to the Mediterranean Sea, visiting Tunis, Tunisia between 21 and 26 August 1975 and Latakia, Syria, between 22 and 27 August 1978.

Between 4 June 1982 and 1 March 1989, Admiral Golovko was docked at Sevmorzavod, Sevastopol, for repairs and modernisation. The ship was stricken by 1991 but was reactivated and served from December 1994 as part of the 21st Anti-Submarine Warfare Brigade and then from December 1995 was attached to the 11th Anti-Submarine Warfare Brigade. The vessel acted as the flagship for the Black Sea Fleet from 1997 (replacing Project 1134B Berkut B warship Kerch) to 2000 (replaced by Project 1164 Atlant cruiser Moskva).

The cruiser was decommissioned in December 2002 and scrapped at Inkerman in 2004.

Pennant numbers

References

1962 ships
Kynda-class cruisers
Ships built at Severnaya Verf
Cold War cruisers of the Soviet Union